Idols 2004 was the second season of Idols Denmark. Rikke Emma Niebuhr won over Louise Baltzer Jensen. Idols in Denmark was subsequently put on an indefinite hiatus after this season, and has not aired since.

Finals

Finalists
(ages stated at time of contest)

Live Show Details

Heat 1 - Top 9 Girls (24 September 2004)

Heat 2 - Top 9 Boys (5 October 2004)

Live Show 1 (12 October 2004)
Theme: Love Songs

Live Show 2 (19 October 2004)
Theme: R&B Hits

Live Show 3 (26 October 2004)
Theme: Latin Hits

Live Show 4 (2 November 2004)
Theme: Rock Hits

Notes
Immediately after the broadcast, TV3 became aware that some viewers had major problems getting through their SMS votes. Since then, it has regrettably been shown that it has in fact been about many more viewers who could not get through to the vote due to a cable breach. Therefore, TV3 decided that Louise would get another chance in the competition.

Live Show 5: Semi-final (9 November 2004)
Theme: Judge's Choice

Live final (16 November 2004)

References

External links
Official Website via Web Archive

Season 02
2004 Danish television seasons